Nora Lewin is a fictional character on the TV show Law & Order, played by two-time Academy Award winning actress Dianne Wiest from 2000 to 2002. She appeared in 51 episodes (48 episodes of Law & Order, one episode of Law & Order: Criminal Intent and two episodes of Law & Order: Special Victims Unit). Her character was particularly notable for the fact that she was the first woman in the program's history to hold the position of New York County District Attorney (no woman has held the position in real life). Pursuant to New York law, an interim District Attorney is appointed by the Governor.

Role within Law & Order
Prior to her appointment as interim DA, Lewin was a law professor, which often provoked her critics to dismiss her as a detached academic with no practical experience. Lewin's term as DA is defined by a liberally directed program of legal application to many notable criminal cases, which often brings her into political and legal dilemmas. While she is an idealist, however, she is not prepared to subvert the correct application of the law due to her personal beliefs. In a 2001 episode, she is confronted with the decision to pursue the death penalty in a conviction of an 18-year-old murderer. While she personally opposes the death penalty, she realizes that her office would be seen as soft on crime, and reluctantly succumbs to political pressure. The young man is found guilty and sent to death row.

Lewin works closely with Jack McCoy (Sam Waterston) and Abbie Carmichael (Angie Harmon). Her political beliefs often put her into conflict with both of them, especially the latter, a staunch political conservative. After Carmichael leaves the DA's office, Lewin replaces her with Serena Southerlyn (Elisabeth Röhm), whose liberal idealism more closely resembles her own political philosophy.

She has a niece, indicating that she has at least one sibling.

Departure
In September 2002, after two years of her term as District Attorney, Lewin departs the office. The manner in which she departed the show is never specified on screen. However, in his tie-in book Law & Order: Crime Scenes, Dick Wolf wrote that his intention for the character was that Lewin found herself disenchanted with the position of D.A., and opted not to run for election following her interim term. Fred Dalton Thompson subsequently joined the cast as Republican Arthur Branch. Wiest later stated, in the book Actors at Work, written by Rosemarie Tichler and Barry Jay Kaplan, that she was tired of the role and wished to move on to other projects.

In her first scene, Lewin is introduced to McCoy by Mayor Rudy Giuliani (playing himself in a cameo appearance), who praises Lewin's record and assures her that she will do a fine job as District Attorney.

Appearances on other TV series
Law & Order: Criminal Intent
Season One
Episode 1: "One"
Law & Order: Special Victims Unit
Season Three
Episode 10: "Ridicule"
Season Four
Episode 1: "Chameleon"

References

Fictional lawyers
Fictional professors
Fictional Democrats (United States)
Law & Order characters
Television characters introduced in 2000
Fictional district attorneys
Crossover characters in television
American female characters in television
Fictional American Jews
pt:Nora Lewin